Garaşsyzlyk Stadium is a multi-purpose stadium in Daşoguz, Turkmenistan.  It is currently used mostly for football matches. The stadium holds 10,000 people.

History 
In February 2011 the Russian company Rus Kurort Stroy started reconstruction of the stadium. There was a large-scale work from scratch. In June 2013 took place the opening ceremony after a complete renovation of stadium. The stadium is covered with new grass lawn, equipped with treadmills and placarded. The rooms are equipped with administrative offices, locker rooms and showers, a dining room, a hall for press conferences, medical center. There are also two indoor sports hall for 250 spectators, a gym and fitness rooms, rooms for coaches and referees, sports shop, volleyball and basketball courts, tennis courts.

See also
Other stadiums in Dashoguz:
 Sport toplumy (Daşoguz)

References

External links
 Stadium picture

Football venues in Turkmenistan
Multi-purpose stadiums in Turkmenistan